Stepnoy is a rural locality (a settlement) and the administrative center of Rossoshenskoye Rural Settlement, Gorodishchensky District, Volgograd Oblast, Russia. The population was 2,273 as of 2010. There are 35 streets.

Geography 
Stepnoy is located in steppe, 33 km northwest of Gorodishche (the district's administrative centre) by road. Krasny Pakhar is the nearest rural locality.

References 

Rural localities in Gorodishchensky District, Volgograd Oblast